Terence John Stephens (born 11 June 1959) is an Australian politician, and a member of the South Australian Legislative Council since being elected in 2002, representing the South Australian Division of the Liberal Party of Australia. He is the President of the South Australian Legislative Council since May 2022. He previously served in this role from February to September 2020, but resigned after becoming embroiled in an allowances scandal.

Background
Prior to his entry in to politics, Stephens was a company director for 20 years, and was involved in community activities, being a life member of South Whyalla Football Club, life member of the Whyalla Football League, patron of Norwood District Basketball Club, a City of Whyalla Councillor, a member of the Whyalla Chamber of Commerce, and chair of the Westlands Traders Association.

Parliamentary service
Because the Liberals lost the 2002 state election to the Labor Party, and Labor retained government at subsequent elections, Stephens was a member of the opposition until the 2018 South Australian state election was won by the Liberals. He held the role of Shadow Parliamentary Secretary assisting with Industry and Trade, Economic Development and Police from April 2006 to April 2007, was the Shadow Parliamentary Secretary to the Liberal Leader for Business Regulation and Red Tape, and Sport, Recreation & Racing to September 2008, then Shadow Parliamentary Secretary to the Leader for Sport, Recreation and Racing,  Small Business, and Red Tape Reduction until July 2009. In July 2009, he was promoted to Shadow Minister for Sport, Recreation and Racing, and Shadow Minister for Tourism, and added Shadow Minister for Corrections, Shadow Minister for Aboriginal Affairs and Shadow Minister for Gambling in April 2010. However, he moved to the backbench in a reshuffle in December 2011.

Stephens became Shadow Parliamentary Secretary for Recreation & Sport, Racing, Aboriginal Affairs and Reconciliation in April 2014.

When the Liberal Party won the 2018 election, Stephens was appointed as Government Whip in the Legislative Council. In February 2020, he replaced Andrew McLachlan as President of the South Australian Legislative Council.

In June 2020, it was alleged that although Stephens had claimed to live in Victor Harbor since 2014, he spent a significant amount of time at his property at Norwood, in Adelaide's inner east, and so had been wrongly claiming an allowance paid to him as a regional MP. Stephens denied any wrongdoing, but announced his resignation as Legislative Council President on 26 July 2020, to take effect when the council resumed after the winter break.

References

 

1959 births
Living people
Members of the South Australian Legislative Council
Liberal Party of Australia members of the Parliament of South Australia
Presidents of the South Australian Legislative Council
21st-century Australian politicians